Ralph Engelstad Arena (The Mini Ralph) (REA) is an indoor arena located in Thief River Falls, Minnesota.  It is used primarily for ice sports, such as hockey, and was built by Jim Kobetsky of Schoen Associates based in Grand Forks, North Dakota. The Venue is the home arena of the Thief River Falls Norskies of the SIJHL and the Lincoln High School Prowlers Hockey Programs (often referred to as the 'Thief River Falls Prowlers'). It replaced the older Huck Olson Memorial Arena which was home to the prowlers since 1970.

History
On February 4, 2002, it was announced the Ralph Engelstad and his wife Betty, whom were living in Las Vegas, Nevada at the time, had donated $10 million which was to be used for a new multi-purpose facility in his hometown Thief River Falls, Minnesota. The project was approved in a city council meeting on February 12, 2002. Despite the donation, it was clear that additional funds would be needed for the project to come to fruition. Thus, a local fundraising campaign began in September of that year, which raised approximately an extra $3 million which was enough money to finish the project.

The Arena would be officially dedicated on November 29, 2003. Though Ralph Engelstad would not live to see this. He would die of Lung Cancer on November 26, 2002 at 72 years old.

In June 2005, The Construction of the Community room, or "Imperial Room" was finished. In the same year, A basketball floor and Arena decking were added.

After Construction was completed, the Engelstad family would donate a further $13 million.

Features
2,800 Theatre-style seats
281 Bar stools along the perimeter of the bowl
2 concession stands
8 bathrooms
Weight Room
Hall of Fame section, which includes a bronze statue of Ralph Engelstad from when he played high school hockey at Thief River Falls as a goaltender

References

External links
Ralph Engelstad Arena - Thief River Falls website
Vintage Minnesota Hockey - Ralph Engelstad Arena
Thief River Falls Norskies Official Website

Indoor ice hockey venues in Minnesota
Buildings and structures in Pennington County, Minnesota
Sports in Thief River Falls, Minnesota